Lake Antoine is a lake in Dickinson County, Michigan, United States.

It was named for Antoine Le Beau, a French fur trader who settled at the lake shore.

See also
List of lakes in Michigan

References

Lakes of Michigan
Bodies of water of Dickinson County, Michigan